Buckeye Township is a township in Hardin County, Iowa, United States.

History
Buckeye Township was organized in 1865.

References

Townships in Hardin County, Iowa
Townships in Iowa
1865 establishments in Iowa